Fontaine-la-Soret is a former commune in the Eure department in the Normandy region in northern France. On 1 January 2017, it was merged into the new commune Nassandres sur Risle.

Population

See also
Communes of the Eure department

References

Former communes of Eure